Gandsfjorden or Gandafjorden is a fjord in Rogaland county, Norway. It runs between the mainland and the Stavanger Peninsula in the western parts of the municipalities of Stavanger and Sandnes. The entire west and south side of the Gandsfjorden is highly developed and urban as this is the location of the cities of Stavanger and Sandnes, the third largest urban area in Norway. The east side of the fjord is far less developed and it has many mountains and peaks. In the outer parts of the fjord there are several islands including Uskjo, Hundvåg, Vassøy, and the Øyane islands of Stavanger.

See also
 List of Norwegian fjords

References

Fjords of Rogaland
Sandnes
Stavanger